Laphria sacrator, or bee-mimic robberfly, is a species of robber flies in the family Asilidae. They have been spotted in some regions in Wisconsin.

Appearance 
Laphria sacrator appears as a winged bug with yellow hairs on the mystax, thorax, and some of the abdomen, with some red hairs.

References

sacrator
Articles created by Qbugbot
Insects described in 1849